Old Hickory Mall is an enclosed shopping mall in Jackson, Tennessee. It is managed by CBL & Associates Properties. It opened as an open-air shopping center in 1967. The anchor stores are Belk and JCPenney; two other anchor spaces are vacant.

History
Old Hickory Mall opened in 1967. It was developed by Hewitt Pegues Tomlin, Jr. and his sister, Francess Tigrett. The mall included a branch of Kisber's, a department store that had been a downtown Jackson fixture since 1906. Around 1978, the mall was enclosed, and a new Kisber's department store was built behind the mall's original one.

In 1985, Richard E. Jacobs Group acquired the mall. By this point, the mall's anchors alongside Kisber's included Memphis-based Goldsmith's, and national retailers J. C. Penney and Sears. By 1996, Kisber's had become Belk.

CBL & Associates Properties bought 21 malls from the Jacobs group in 2000, including Old Hickory. Changes that followed the CBL acquisition included an Abercrombie & Fitch store opening in 2003, displacing the food court; and a conversion of the mall's Goldsmith's store to Macy's in 2005. Despite the loss of the food court, as of 2013, there is a seating area and a handful of establishments to purchase food from.

On December 28, 2018, it was announced that Sears would be closing as part of a plan to close 80 stores nationwide; the store closed in March 2019.

On January 6, 2021, it was announced that Macy's would be closing that April as part of a plan to close 46 stores nationwide. Macy’s ended up shuttering its doors in March, a month early, leaving the Old Hickory Mall with only two of its four anchors remaining, Belk and JCPenney.

References

External links
Official website

Shopping malls in Tennessee
Jackson, Tennessee
CBL Properties
Shopping malls established in 1967